Zangelan or Zangalan in Iran may refer to:
 Zangelan-e Olya
 Zangelan-e Sofla

See also
 Zangelan (disambiguation)